Patrīcija Špaka (born 29 August 2002) is a Latvian tennis player.

Career
Špaka represents Latvia in Billie Jean King Cup competition. She made her debut at the 2021 play-offs against India.

ITF Circuit finals

Doubles: 1 (runner–up)

Notes

References

External links

2002 births
Living people
Latvian female tennis players
Arizona State Sun Devils women's tennis players